Chrysallida annobonensis is a species of sea snail, a marine gastropod mollusk in the family Pyramidellidae, the pyrams and their allies. The species is one of multiple species within the large Chrysallida genus of gastropods.

Distribution

This species only occurs on the island of Annobón, Equatorial Guinea.

References

External links
 To Encyclopedia of Life
 To World Register of Marine Species

annobonensis
Gastropods described in 2002
Fauna of Annobón
Invertebrates of Equatorial Guinea